Pentatonix World Tour was the fifth headlining concert tour by American a cappella group Pentatonix to promote their eponymous album. The tour began in Chiba on April 2, 2016, and concluded in Essex Junction on September 3, 2017.

Background and development
On February 9, 2016, Pentatonix announced the tour. The group announced the first leg taking place in the United States and Canada with Us The Duo and AJ Lehrman as the opening acts. The leg ran from April 13, 2016, until May 12, 2016. On February 23, 2016, Popspring 2016 announced the group as a headliner of the festival in Chiba, Kobe, and Nagoya. The second leg took place across Europe. The leg ran from May 23, 2016, until June 26, 2016. Us The Duo stayed on the road, in addition to Erato who opened in just Birmingham and London. On April 2, 2016, Summer Sonic Festival announced the group as a headliner of the festival in Chiba and Osaka. The third leg took place across Oceania. The leg ran from September 3, 2016, until September 10, 2016. The fourth leg took place across Asia. The leg ran from September 13, 2016, until September 27, 2016. The fifth leg took place back in the United States and Canada with Us The Duo returning as the opening act, and newly added, Abi Ann, who was a fellow opening act when they opened Kelly Clarkson's Piece by Piece Tour. The leg ran from October 17, 2016, until November 22, 2016. Continuing the tour, the group announced a number of special performances for the summer of 2017. They kicked off their 2017 shows with another Asian leg with five shows in Japan. They also toured North America starting with three shows in Los Angeles at the Hollywood Bowl for the venue's July 4 Firework Spectacular, and a number of shows at fairs and festivals in Columbus, West Allis, Des Moines, Grand Island, Highland Park, Saint Paul, Allentown, and Essex Junction.

Set list
This set list is representative of the show on November 10, 2016, in Newark, New Jersey. It is not representative of all concerts for the duration of the tour.

"Cracked"
"Na Na Na"
"Cheerleader" (OMI cover)
"Can't Sleep Love"
"Evolution of Michael Jackson"
"Love Yourself" / "Where Are Ü Now" (Justin Bieber and Skrillex & Diplo cover medley)
"Jolene" (Dolly Parton cover; duet with Us The Duo)
"Prelude from Cello Suite No. 1" (Bach cello cover from Kevin)
"Radioactive" / "Say Something" / "Papaoutai" (Imagine Dragons, A Great Big World, and Stromae cover medley)
"No" (Meghan Trainor cover)
"Gold" (Kiiara cover)
"Misbehavin'"
"Water"
"Christus factus est" (by Anton Bruckner)
"Aha!" (Imogen Heap cover)
"Daft Punk"
"Rose Gold"
"Hallelujah" (Leonard Cohen cover)
Encore
 "Light In The Hallway"
 "Sing"

Tour dates

Notes

References

2016 concert tours
2017 concert tours
Pentatonix concert tours